The , also known as  or , is a law that regulates entertainment places in Japan.

History 
 1948: Creation of the law.
 April 1, 1959: Name change.
 August 14, 1984: Extension to some businesses before midnight.
 April 1998: Extension to some massage businesses and adult videos transmission by Internet.
 November 2005: Penal regulation enforcement, various new rules.
 January 2015: Proposition to relax the law is rejected.
Effective 2016 the law will be relaxed, allowing permits for exceptions as long as certain conditions are met including lighting and not operating near residential areas.

Targets

Businesses offering food and entertainment 
 Category 1: Japanese cabaret.
 Category 2: Kyabakura (hostess bar).
 Category 3: Business where customers can eat and dance.
 Category 4: Dance hall.
 At first this covered dance schools too. Dance schools were removed from this category in 1998 after the movie Shall We Dance? made ballroom dance popular.
 Category 5: Bar.
 Category 6: Mahjong and pachinko parlor.
 Category 7: Amusement arcade.

Sex industry 

 Within a local
 Category 1: Soapland.
 Category 2: Fashion health.
 Category 3: Striptease theater, Adult movie theater.
 Category 4: Love hotel.
 Category 5: Sex shop, Adult video arcade.
 Category 6: Members-only bar for meeting persons of the opposite sex. This category was created on January 1, 2011.
 Without a local
 Category 1: Delivery health (call girl).
 Category 2: Pornography mail order.
 Others
 Pornography video by Internet, brothel selection websites.
 Telekura.
 Telekura operated from home, for instance using a cellular telephone.

Businesses selling alcohol after midnight 
Selling alcohol after midnight requires a permission. Also, after 10pm family restaurants must refuse non-accompanied people under 18 years old.

Authorization 
Business in the "Businesses offering food and entertainment" class require an authorization from the prefecture's public safety commission.

Business in the "Sex industry" and "Businesses selling alcohol after midnight" classes do not require an authorization, but require a notification.

Consequence on nightclubs 

Dance is forbidden in nightclubs with dancefloors smaller than 66 square meters, or nightclubs that operate after 1am (midnight in some areas). While this rule has been mostly ignored for 50 years, arous 2011 it started to be enforced by the police in Osaka, Fukuoka and Tokyo. This led most nightclubs to display "No Dancing" signs, and some employed security personnel to actually prevent customers from dancing.

In 2013, organization Let's Dance submitted a petition signed by 155,879 people to the National Diet, demanding that the part of the law regulating dancing be updated. Let's Dance has a sub-group called Dance Lawyers.

The cabinet agreed to lift the ban on dancing in October 2014. Some have speculated this was in view of the 2020 Summer Olympics.

See also
 Prostitution Prevention Law

References 

Japanese legislation
Entertainment in Japan
Prostitution in Japan